In mathematics, a Stone algebra, or Stone lattice, is a pseudo-complemented distributive lattice such that  a* ∨ a** = 1.

Boolean algebras are Stone algebras, and Stone algebras are Ockham algebras.

Examples:
 The open-set lattice of an extremally disconnected space is a Stone algebra.
 The lattice of positive divisors of a given positive integer is a Stone lattice.

See also
 De Morgan algebra
 Heyting algebra

References

Universal algebra
Lattice theory
Ockham algebras